The 1991–92 season of the European Cup Winners' Cup was won by Werder Bremen in the final against Monaco. Both were first-time finalists in the competition.

Defending champions Manchester United were eliminated by Atlético Madrid in the second round.

Teams
A total of 34 teams participated in the competition.

Notes

Qualifying round

|}

First leg

Second leg

Odense won 7–0 on aggregate.

Tottenham Hotspur won 2–0 on aggregate.

First round

|}

First leg

Second leg

Werder Bremen won 11–0 on aggregate.

Monaco won 10–1 on aggregate.

Atlético Madrid won 8–2 on aggregate.

Manchester United won 2–0 on aggregate.

3–3 on aggregate; GKS Katowice won on away goals.

Club Brugge won 4–0 on aggregate.

Ferencváros won 7–3 on aggregate.

Galatasaray won 5–1 on aggregate.

Baník Ostrava won 4–1 on aggregate.

4–4 on aggregate; Ilves won on away goals.

2–2 on aggregate; Roma won on away goals.

Norrköping won 6–1 on aggregate.

Sion won 2–1 on aggregate.

Feyenoord won 1–0 on aggregate.

Tottenham Hotspur won 2–1 on aggregate.

Porto won 4–0 on aggregate.

Second round

|}

First leg

Second leg

Monaco won 3–1 on aggregate.

Atlético Madrid won 4–1 on aggregate.

Club Brugge won 4–0 on aggregate.

Werder Bremen won 4–2 on aggregate.

2–2 on aggregate; Galatasaray won on away goals.

Roma won 6–3 on aggregate.

0–0 on aggregate; Feyenoord won 5–3 on penalties.

Tottenham Hotspur won 3–1 on aggregate.

Quarter-finals

|}

First leg

Second leg

4–4 on aggregate. Club Brugge won on away goals.

Werder Bremen won 2–1 on aggregate.

Monaco won 1–0 on aggregate.

Feyenoord won 1–0 on aggregate.

Semi-finals

|}

First leg

Second leg

Werder Bremen won 2–1 on aggregate.

3–3 on aggregate. Monaco won on away goals.

Final

Top scorers
The top scorers from the 1991–92 UEFA Cup Winners' Cup are as follows:

See also
 1991–92 European Cup
 1991–92 UEFA Cup

References

External links
 1991-92 competition at UEFA website
 Cup Winners' Cup results at Rec.Sport.Soccer Statistics Foundation
 Cup Winners Cup Seasons 1991-92–results, protocols

3
UEFA Cup Winners' Cup seasons